The 2007 Ebonyi State House of Assembly election was held on April 14, 2015, to elect members of the Ebonyi State House of Assembly in Nigeria. All the 24 seats were up for election in the Ebonyi State House of Assembly.

Results

Izzi West 
PDP candidate Augustine Nwankwegu won the election.

Onicha East 
PDP candidate Odefa Obasi Odefa won the election.

Ezza North West 
PDP candidate Emmanuel Nwobo won the election.

Afikpo North West 
PDP candidate Sylvester Oko Omeri won the election.

Ebonyi North West 
PDP candidate Ikechukwu Nwankwo won the election.

Ezza South 
PDP candidate Aleke Emmanuel won the election.

Ohaozara West 
PDP candidate Aja Samuel Onu won the election.

Ezza North East 
PDP candidate Patrick Mgbebu Nworu won the election.

Afikpo South West 
PDP candidate Uduma Chima Eni won the election.

Izzi East 
PDP candidate Richard Idike Ugo won the election.

Abakaliki North 
PDP candidate Jude A.P. Okolo won the election.

Ikwo North 
PDP candidate Nwali Samuel won the election.

Ohaukwu South 
PDP candidate Kennedy Ogba won the election.

Ebonyi North East 
PDP candidate Bede Johnson Nwali won the election.

Afikpo South East 
PDP candidate Dorothy Ogonnaya Obasi won the election.

Ikwo South 
PDP candidate Ogiji Imo Chike won the election.

Ishielu South 
PDP candidate Gabriel Ede Ebenyi won the election.

Ivo 
PDP candidate Orji Uchenna Orji won the election.

Ohaozara East 
PDP candidate Nwogu Iheanacho won the election.

Ohaukwu North 
PDP candidate Vincent Awoke Ome won the election.

Onicha West 
PDP candidate Mike Anoke Ude Umanta won the election.

Abakaliki South 
PDP candidate Helen Nwabosi won the election.

Ishielu North 
PDP candidate Nwachukwu Johnson won the election.

Afikpo North East 
PDP candidate Ben Ndubuisi Isu won the election.

References 

Ebonyi State
House of Assembly elections in Nigeria by state